Raj Tilak is a 1958 Indian Hindi-language Ruritanian romance epic film written by the Gemini Studios story department, consisting of K. J. Mahadevan, C. Srinivasan and Kothamangalam Subbu, along with Ramanand Sagar, while the film was directed and produced by S. S. Vasan. The film features Gemini Ganeshan, Padmini, Vyjayanthimala in the lead roles, along with Pran, Gajanan Jagirdar, Bipin Gupta, Manmohan Krishna, Lalita Pawar, Durga Khote, Agha, Shammi forming an ensemble cast. The music was composed by C. Ramchandra.

The screenplay was written by Ramanand Sagar. The film was a remake of 1958 Tamil film Vanjikottai Valiban.

Plot
Chandrashekhar, shortly called Chandar, lives and works in a ship with his sister Savitri, they are raised by the ship's captain. Now, Chandar becomes busy for Savitri's marriage and fixes in a decent family. Before marriage, Savitri is abducted by Senapati Durjay Singh; to save her honour, she kills herself in front of Chandar. Enraged Chandar vows to take revenge on Durjan, but captured by his goons and jailed in a fort, where he meets his long-lost mother. There he learns of his past as he is the son of Mangalsen, who was the faithful Chief Minister under Maharaja Vikram Singh, who was killed by none other than Durjay; to save the Prince and Princess, Mangalsen took them with him, on the other side his wife took their son and daughter to escape by boats, however, Mangalsen managed to escape while his wife failed and was captured by Durjay's goons, leaving her children on the boat, separating them from their parents. Now, Chandar hits upon a plan for meeting his father as well as taking revenge on Durjay. However, his mother dies in the jail and Chandar manages to escape, ends up to be in a ship, which transports him to the arrogant Princess Mandakini, who wants Chandar as her slave for lifetime. On the other side, Mangalsen, who now becomes Sardar and trains the villagers, along with Princess Padma and Prince, for fighting against the evils.

Cast 
 Gemini Ganeshan as Chandrashekhar "Chandar"
 Padmini as Princess Padma
 Vyjayanthimala as Princess Mandakini
 Pran as Senapati Durjay Singh
 Gajanan Jagirdar as Sardar Mangalsen
 Durga Khote as Mangalsen's wife
 Bipin Gupta as Maharaja Vikram Singh
 Manmohan Krishna as Madhav
 Lalita Pawar as Alka
 Romi as Prince
 Agha as Govind
 Shammi as Govind's wife
 Kumar as Ship Captain
 C. R. Vijayakumari as Savitri
 Meenakshi as Maharani
 T. K. Ramachandran as Gajpal

Soundtrack
The music was composed by C. Ramchandra and the lyrics were written by P. L. Santoshi.

Inspirations and remakes
The film was a remake of 1958 Tamil film Vanjikottai Valiban, which also directed by S. S. Vasan with Gemini Ganeshan, Vyjayanthimala and Padmini. The film itself was inspired by the 1844 novel The Count of Monte Cristo by Alexandre Dumas.

References

External links
 
 Raj Tilak profile at Upperstall.com

1958 films
Hindi remakes of Tamil films
1950s Hindi-language films
Films about royalty
Films based on The Count of Monte Cristo
Films directed by S. S. Vasan
Films scored by C. Ramchandra
Gemini Studios films